Men at Work is a 2006 Iranian comedy written and directed by Mani Haghighi. It was awarded best film in 10th Dhaka International Film Festival.

Plot 
Four men on a skiing trip encounter a tall boulder standing precariously near a cliff. The men resolve to push it over but find the task to be more difficult than anticipated. Over the course of a day the men unbury the rock, culminating in the boulder falling unnoticed while the men argue about whether to continue.

Cast
Mahnaz Afshar as Sahar
Ahmad Hamed as Mammad
Mahmoud Kalari as Mohsen
Reza Kianian as  Jalil
Fatemah Motamed Aria as Mina
Atila Pesyani as Morteza
Omid Roohani as Nader
Rana Azadivar as Jalil's Accompany

References

2006 films
Iranian comedy films
2000s Persian-language films
Films directed by Mani Haghighi